Agnippe aequorea is a moth in the family Gelechiidae. It is found in Peru.

The wingspan is about 8 mm. The forewings are dark fuscous, sprinkled with whitish and with a cloudy whitish dorsal streak from the base to tornus, speckled with dark fuscous, pointed posteriorly, edge irregular. The hindwings are pale slaty-grey in males and grey in females.

References

Agnippe
Moths described in 1917
Moths of South America